Ángela Corina Clavijo Silva (born 1 September 1993), known as Korina, is a Colombian professional footballer who plays as a centre back for Brazilian Série A1 club Cruzeiro EC and the Colombia women's national team.

References

External links 
 

1993 births
Living people
People from Villavicencio
Colombian women's footballers
Women's association football midfielders
América de Cali (women) players
Sporting de Huelva players
Deportivo Cali (women) players
Cruzeiro Esporte Clube players
Primera División (women) players
Campeonato Brasileiro de Futebol Feminino Série A1 players
Colombia women's international footballers
2015 FIFA Women's World Cup players
Olympic footballers of Colombia
Footballers at the 2016 Summer Olympics
Pan American Games competitors for Colombia
Footballers at the 2015 Pan American Games
Colombian expatriate women's footballers
Colombian expatriate sportspeople in Spain
Expatriate women's footballers in Spain
Colombian expatriate sportspeople in Brazil
Expatriate women's footballers in Brazil
Pan American Games silver medalists for Colombia
Medalists at the 2015 Pan American Games
Pan American Games medalists in football
20th-century Colombian women
21st-century Colombian women